Barão de São Miguel is a village and civil parish (freguesia) located in Portugal's western Algarve.  Administratively, it is part of the municipality (municipio) of Vila do Bispo.

Geography
The village is located in the Vale de Barão on the road between Budens and Barão de São João. Barão de São Miguel is just outside of the boundary of the Southwest Alentejo and Vicentine Coast Natural Park.

Vital statistics
In 2011 it had 451 inhabitants (231 males and 220 females).

Buildings
Barão de São Miguel resembles many rural villages in the Algarve. Its housing stock mainly consists of small white houses with traditional chimneys, a domestic architectural style influenced by the Moorish occupation of the area up to the thirteenth century.

The village church was constructed in the sixteenth century and features a tower and just a single nave.  Its baroque high altar is dedicated to the Archangel Michael.

Near to the N125 to the south of the village, lime kilns are to be found.  These were originally constructed to supply the nearby city of Lagos.

References

Villages in Portugal
Villages in the Algarve
Populated places in Faro District
Freguesias of Vila do Bispo